Daniel Louis Schweickart is an electrical engineer at the Air Force Research Laboratory in Dayton, Ohio. He was named a Fellow of the Institute of Electrical and Electronics Engineers (IEEE) in 2012 for his contributions to insulation systems and the development of design guidelines for aerospace applications.

References

20th-century births
Living people
Fellow Members of the IEEE
Year of birth missing (living people)
Place of birth missing (living people)
American electrical engineers